Magnesium chlorate is an inorganic chemical consisting of a magnesium cation and two chlorate anions: its chemical formula is Mg(ClO3)2.

Production
Magnesium chlorate was first produced in 1920 by reacting magnesium oxide with chlorine gas to produce a mixture of magnesium chloride and magnesium chlorate. They were not able to separate the magnesium chlorate from the magnesium chloride. Other production methods were reported such as reacting chlorine gas with magnesium hydroxide or magnesium carbonate to create magnesium hypochlorite then converting the hypochlorite to the chlorate. But, not a lot of studies have been done on the properties of magnesium chlorate. The most modern method is converting magnesium chloride electrochemically:

MgCl2 + 6 H2O + e− → Mg(ClO3)2 + 6 H2

After, the magnesium chlorate was separated from the magnesium chloride by using the solubility of magnesium chlorate in acetone.

Properties
Magnesium chlorate forms a hexahydrate Mg(ClO3)2·6H2O which decomposes to the tetrahydrate at 35 °C.  At 65 °C, it dehydrates to the dihydrate, then at 80 °C forms a basic salt. If further heated to 120 °C it decomposes to water, oxygen, chlorine, and magnesium oxide.

Hazards
Magnesium chlorate forms explosive mixtures with glucose, charcoal, shellac, sulfur, starch, and other organic substances, sulfuric acid, and other acidic substances, potassium cyanide, phosphorus, antimony trisulfide, and some other compounds. This can be prevented by mixing a small amount of sodium carbonate to prevent exploding when near organic substances.

Uses
Magnesium(II) chlorate is used as a powerful desiccant and a defoliant for cotton, potato, and rice. It is also found as a lubricant in eye drops as an inactive ingredient.

Natural occurrence
The hydrated version of this compound has been spotted on Martian surfaces such as the Hale crater by the Mars Reconnaissance Orbiter, which suggests that the compound absorbs water from the Martian surface by the moisture present on the surface to form a very concentrated solution. When these solutions form, the solution can stay liquid down to –70 °C.

References

Magnesium compounds
Chlorates